Porfirio Reynoso (born 4 May 1950) is a Cuban rower. He competed in the men's eight event at the 1976 Summer Olympics.

References

1950 births
Living people
Cuban male rowers
Olympic rowers of Cuba
Rowers at the 1976 Summer Olympics
Place of birth missing (living people)
Pan American Games medalists in rowing
Pan American Games silver medalists for Cuba
Rowers at the 1971 Pan American Games
Rowers at the 1975 Pan American Games